Electoral history of Warren G. Harding, who served as the 29th president of the United States (1921-1923); a U.S. senator from Ohio (1915-1921); and the 28th lieutenant governor of Ohio (1904-1906).

Ohio gubernatorial races (1903-1910)

United States Senate election (1914)

Presidential elections (1916-1920)

1916 Republican National Convention 

Source -

1920 United States presidential election

1920 Republican National Convention

Presidential election

Sources and references 

Work cited
 

Warren G. Harding
Harding, Warren G.
Harding, Warren G.